Aubigny is a commune of the Allier department in central France.

Population

Administration 
 2008–2014: Michel Brunol
 2014–current: Étienne Richet

See also
Communes of the Allier department

References

Communes of Allier
Bourbonnais